George Burdi, also known as George Eric Hawthorne (born 1970), is a Canadian musician, publisher, traditionalist, mysticist, and a white power musician who became known for his role in white nationalist organizations. He led the Canadian branch of the World Church of the Creator, which formed an alliance with the now-defunct white nationalist organization Heritage Front. In addition, Burdi performed with the white power band RaHoWa.

Burdi was convicted of assault causing bodily harm in 1995, and was sentenced to one year in prison. Upon his release from prison, Burdi claimed to have renounced racism. By 2017, he had resumed promoting extremist views and producing white nationalist music.

Early life 
Burdi was born in 1970 to a Ukrainian mother and Italian father, both of whom were immigrants.

Activism
Burdi came into contact with the white nationalist movement through the father of his then German girlfriend. He became an active White nationalist at the age of 18, and by the age of 21, was the leader of the Canadian branch of the World Church of the Creator, which at its peak had fewer than 20 members. During this period, he wrote a number of articles for the Church of the Creator newspaper, Racial Loyalty, using the name "Rev. Eric Hawthorne" (including the January 1992 cover story, "Enter the Racial Holy War"). He has been credited with helping to secure the survival of Creativity after the death, in 1993, of its founder Ben Klassen.

RaHoWa 
Using the pseudonym "Reverend George Eric Hawthorne", Burdi formed the racist band RaHoWa in 1989. The band's name was derived from the phrase Racial Holy War. RaHoWa was one of the biggest hate-rock bands throughout the 1990s. Burdi was also the founding president of Resistance Records, which was the distributor for his band, and other white nationalist bands. The company also operated a web site, and published a magazine, Resistance, which covered the white nationalist music scene.

Reckzin incident 
In Ottawa, on May 29, 1993, after a RaHoWa concert which was picketed by Anti-Racist Action protesters, Burdi and the leader of the White nationalist Heritage Front, Wolfgang Droege, led their supporters on a march to Parliament Hill, chanting "sieg heil", making racist remarks, and giving the Hitler salute. At Parliament Hill, the two addressed their followers.

Burdi then led the group to the Chateau Laurier, where he led a charge across the street to confront protesters. During the charge, Alicia Reckzin  was struck on the head while running from Burdi's supporters. When she fell, she was kicked several times on her right side; Reckzin later reported having seen Burdi kick her in the face.

In 1995, as a result of the violent confrontation, Burdi was convicted of assault causing bodily harm, and sentenced to 12 months imprisonment. Burdi appealed both his conviction and the sentence, but on February 14, 1997, the Court of Appeal for Ontario upheld the lower court's 1995 decision (O.J. No. 554 No. C21788/C21820), and Burdi began his sentence. The court "ruled him out as the kicker," but he was found guilty of vicarious liability by having led the charge across the street. Burdi continues to deny having assaulted Reckzin.

Renunciation of racism 
In 1997, much of Resistance Record's inventory and business paraphernalia were seized in an April raid by the Oakland County, Michigan Sheriff's Department, the Michigan Department of the Treasury, and the Ontario Provincial Police. The same day this raid was carried out in Michigan, Burdi was arrested in Windsor, Ontario, for contravening the Canadian Criminal Code provisions against promoting hatred.

Convicted in Windsor, Burdi was able to avoid a jail sentence with the condition that he not be involved with RaHoWa or Resistance Records. He sold the company to Willis Carto who soon sold it to National Alliance head William Luther Pierce. Burdi then renounced white nationalism.

Novacosm
In 1998 Burdi founded the multi-racial band Novacosm.  The band, with Burdi on vocals and guitar, B. Valentine on bass and Sy Sylver on guitar, began performing publicly in 2001, and released some recordings as mp3s. Novacosm released one compact disc, Everything Forever, in 2003.

Return to far-right activism and to music 
In 2017, Burdi revealed in an interview with German neo-Nazi YouTube channel FSN.tv that he felt he had never truly abandoned white nationalism and claimed that the media took statements that he made during his hiatus from "the movement" out of context. Burdi maintained contact with up to 100 individuals active in right-wing extremist movements, mainly in Europe, throughout the period in which he had allegedly abandoned racism. Burdi further stated that the esoteric neo-Nazi Savitri Devi, who combined Nazism with Hinduism, sparked his interest in Hinduism and helped him connect with his Hindu wife. Burdi also stated that he views the development of the alt-right as a positive thing and questions whether he ever would have abandoned neo-Nazism if he had lived in Europe at the time of his disillusionment with the skinhead scene.

In the same interview with the German neo-Nazis, Burdi praises a fascist musical group from France called  and their music video "Le grand remplacement", which promotes a conspiracy theory alleging that Jews are in favor of an "Islamic invasion" of Europe in order to bring about conditions for the coming of the "Messiah of Israel."

References

External links 

 Disinfocast with Matt Staggs – 2012 Audio Interview .
 Life After Hate – U.S.-based organization.
 Ontario Court of Appeal
 Present at the Creation  Interview with Burdi by the anti-racist Southern Poverty Law Center.
 Novacosm band website
 IFILM about George Burdi and Novacosm
 I am not my DNA recent interview from Acid Logic.
 Interview With Burdi
 Leaving Racism Behind  Video Interview. George Burdi talks about leaving hate behind.

1970 births
Canadian neo-Nazis
Canadian people convicted of assault
Canadian rock singers
Creativity (religion)
Living people
21st-century Canadian male singers
Neo-Nazi music